Thirteen Preludes (Trinadtsat' prelyudiy), Op. 32, is a set of thirteen preludes for solo piano, composed by Sergei Rachmaninoff in 1910.

It complements his earlier Prelude in C minor, Op. 3/2, and 10 Preludes, Op. 23, to complete the full set of 24 Preludes in all 24 major and minor keys.

Pieces
Opus 32 contains 13 preludes:

No. 1 in C major (Allegro vivace)
No. 2 in B minor (Allegretto)
No. 3 in E major (Allegro vivace)
No. 4 in E minor (Allegro con brio)
No. 5 in G major (Moderato)
No. 6 in F minor (Allegro appassionato)
No. 7 in F major (Moderato)
No. 8 in A minor (Vivo)
No. 9 in A major (Allegro moderato)
No. 10 in B minor (Lento)
No. 11 in B major (Allegretto)
No. 12 in G minor (Allegro)
No. 13 in D major (Grave – Allegro)

Prelude No. 10 

Prelude in B minor, Op. 32, No. 10, was written in 1910 along with the other twelve pieces. Rachmaninoff was inspired by Arnold Böcklin's painting "Die Heimkehr" ("The Homecoming" or "The Return"). Rachmaninoff also stated to pianist Benno Moiseiwitsch that this was his personal favourite among his preludes. This is the second work of Rachmaninoff's to be inspired by one of Böcklin's paintings; the other being Isle of the Dead.

See also
 Preludes (Rachmaninoff)
 Music written in all major and/or minor keys

References

Sources 
Baylor, Murray, Rachmaninoff 13 Preludes, Opus 32, For the Piano, Pg. 5. Alfred Music Publishing, New York,1988.
Brennan, Gerald, Schrott, Allen, Woodstra, Chris,  All Music Guide to Classical Music: The Definitive Guide to Classical Music,  	Backbeat Books, California, 2005

External links
 
  Piano.ru – Sheet music download
  Chubrik.ru – Audio download
 Live Recording on YouTube Video of Willis Miller's live recording of No. 12 in G♯ minor (Allegro).

1910 compositions
Preludes by Sergei Rachmaninoff